Manic Moonlight is the ninth studio album by American rock band King's X, released in 2001 via Metal Blade Records. The album was notable for its inclusion of electronic loops.

Critical reception
AllMusic called the album "the most confidently organic and groove-based record of [the band's] career." Exclaim! wrote that "all the requisite solid performances, chunky grooves, flashy guitar work and beautifully realised vocal harmonies are here, but they're too often obscured by muddy compositions and an apparent desire to get modern with the use of samples, record scratching and loop beats." In an article about Greg Prato's oral history of the band, Rolling Stone called the album "underrated."

Track listing

The Japanese release has two bonus tracks:

"Vegetable" (long version) - 7:36
"Believe" (long version) - 6:26

Personnel
Doug Pinnick – bass, vocals
Ty Tabor – guitar, vocals
Jerry Gaskill – drums, vocals

Liner notes 
 Produced and mixed by Ty Tabor
 All songs written by King's X
 Recorded between February and May 2001 at Alien Beans Studios
 Engineered and mastered by Ty Tabor at Alien Beans Studios
 Graphics by Brian J Ames
 Cover art by Ty Tabor

Charts

References

External links
Official band website

2001 albums
King's X albums
Metal Blade Records albums